Rock 'n' Roll Fantasy: The Very Best of Bad Company is a compilation album released by Bad Company in 2015 on Atlantic Records. The 19-track collection spans 1974 through 1982 and features many of the group's best-known songs, like "Can't Get Enough", "Feel Like Makin' Love" and "Rock 'n' Roll Fantasy".
 
The release includes previously unreleased alternate versions of "Easy on My Soul" and "See the Sunlight". Both of these are different versions than the ones that appeared on the deluxe editions of Bad Company and Straight Shooter, respectively.

Track listing
 "Can't Get Enough" (Mick Ralphs), from Bad Company (1974)
 "Bad Company" (Paul Rodgers, Simon Kirke), from Bad Company
 "Movin' On" (Ralphs), from Bad Company
 "Ready for Love" (Ralphs), from Bad Company
 "Easy on My Soul" (Rodgers), taken from the B-side of the US single "Movin' On" (1974)
 "Good Lovin' Gone Bad" (Ralphs), from Straight Shooter (1975)
 "Feel Like Makin' Love" (Rodgers, Ralphs), from Straight Shooter
 "Shooting Star" (Rodgers), from Straight Shooter
 "Weep No More" (Rodgers), from Straight Shooter
 "See the Sunlight" Previously unreleased
 "Live for the Music"  (Ralphs), from Run with the Pack (1976)
 "Simple Man" from Run with the Pack (1976)
 "Honey Child" (Rodgers, Ralphs, Kirke, Boz Burrell), from Run with the Pack (1976)
 "Run with the Pack" (Rodgers), from Run with the Pack
 "Burnin' Sky" (Rodgers), from Burnin' Sky (1977)
 "Rock 'n' Roll Fantasy" (Rodgers), from Desolation Angels (1979)
 "Rhythm Machine" (Kirke, Burrell), from Desolation Angels (1979)
 "Gone, Gone, Gone" (Burrell), From  Desolation Angels (1979)
 "Electricland" (Rodgers, Kirke), from Rough Diamonds (1982)

Personnel 
Bad Company
Paul Rodgers – vocals, rhythm guitar, piano
Mick Ralphs – guitar, keyboards on "Ready for Love"
Boz Burrell – bass
Simon Kirke – drums

Production
Produced by Paul Rodgers for Bad Company

References

Bad Company compilation albums
2015 greatest hits albums
Atlantic Records compilation albums